Reeves–Iszard–Godfey House, also known as the Philip Godfrey House, is located in Upper Township, Cape May County, New Jersey, United States. The house was built in 1695 and added to the National Register of Historic Places on March 9, 2005.

See also
National Register of Historic Places listings in Cape May County, New Jersey

References

Houses on the National Register of Historic Places in New Jersey
Houses completed in 1695
Houses in Cape May County, New Jersey
National Register of Historic Places in Cape May County, New Jersey
Upper Township, New Jersey
New Jersey Register of Historic Places
1695 establishments in New Jersey